Isaac Olatunde Olubowale is an Anglican bishop in Nigeria: he is the current Bishop of Ekiti Oke.

A former archdeacon, Olubowale was formerly the incumbent  St. James, Suleja. He was consecrated on 25 July 2004 as the pioneer Bishop of Ekiti Oke.

Notes

Living people
Anglican bishops of Ekiti Oke
21st-century Anglican bishops in Nigeria
Year of birth missing (living people)
Church of Nigeria archdeacons